The men's discus throw at the 1962 European Athletics Championships was held in Belgrade, then Yugoslavia, at JNA Stadium on 12 and 13 September 1962.

Medalists

Results

Final
13 September

Qualification
12 September

Participation
According to an unofficial count, 27 athletes from 17 countries participated in the event.

 (1)
 (2)
 (2)
 (2)
 (1)
 (2)
 (2)
 (3)
 (1)
 (1)
 (2)
 (2)
 (1)
 (1)
 (1)
 (1)
 (2)

References

Discus throw
Discus throw at the European Athletics Championships